Hotel of Mum and Dad is a British factual television series that was first broadcast on BBC Three starting on 3 October 2013. The series shows young couples who live at one of their parents' homes moving out together for the first time. The BBC announced the commissioning of a second series on 13 February 2014, and commenced airing it on 29 September 2014.

Production
The executive producers are Kat Lennox and Hannah Wyatt and the series producer is Sarah Ladbury. The production company is Mentorn Media and the distributor is Passion Distribution. The first series featured couples in several towns in the United Kingdom, including Stevenage and Swansea.

The second series featured six one-hour-length episodes, set in the United Kingdom. These episodes aired on both BBC Three and BBC Three HD television channels. Lennox remained as executive producer, whilst Tom Jackson directed, and Grimshaw continued his role as narrator.

Reception
John Crace of The Guardian said the series was "missing the important questions". Time Out Gabriel Tate gave it two stars out of five and called the format "stifling".

References

External links
 
 
 

BBC reality television shows
2013 British television series debuts
2014 British television series endings
Television shows set in the United Kingdom
English-language television shows